Jon J Muth (born July 28, 1960) is an American writer and illustrator of children's books as well as graphic novels and comic books.

Career
Muth studied stone sculpture and shodō (書道) (brush calligraphy) in Japan; and studied painting, printmaking, and drawing in England, Austria, and Germany.

In the comics industry, his works include J. M. DeMatteis' graphic novel Moonshadow, Grant Morrison's The Mystery Play, Neil Gaiman's The Sandman: The Wake with Michael Zulli and Charles Vess, Mike Carey's Lucifer: Nirvana and Swamp Thing: Roots. He worked with writers Walt and Louise Simonson and co-artist Kent Williams on Havok and Wolverine: Meltdown in 1988. That series was a result of Williams and Muth's desire to work on a project together. Muth received an Eisner Award in the category "Best Painter/Multimedia Artist (Interior Art)" in 1995 for his work on The Mystery Play.

In addition, Muth has had an award-winning career as a children's book writer and illustrator. He explained that "A sense of joy is what moved me from comics to picture books. My work in children's books grew out of a desire to explore what I was feeling as a new father." He received a Gold Medal from the Society of Illustrators in 1999 for his illustrations in Come On, Rain! by Karen Hesse. Muth created a version of the stone soup fable set in China and illustrated cards for the Magic: The Gathering collectible card game. In 2005, Muth collaborated with author Caroline Kennedy on A Family of Poems: My Favorite Poetry for Children.

Bibliography
Muth has authored and illustrated a number of books for a variety of publishing houses.

Art collections
 Vanitas: Paintings, Drawings and Ideas Tundra Publishing, 1991
 Pictures Places Stone Allen Spiegel Fine Arts, 1993
 Koan: Paintings by Jon J Muth & Kent Williams with Kent Williams, Allen Spiegel Fine Arts, November 2001,

Children's books authored and illustrated
 The Three Questions, Scholastic Press, April 2002, 
 Stone Soup, Scholastic Press, March 2003, 
 Zen Shorts, Scholastic Press, March 2005, 
 Zen Ties, Scholastic Press, February 2008, 
 Zen Ghosts, Scholastic Press, September 2010, 
 Hi, Koo!, Scholastic Press, February 2014, 
 Zen Socks, Scholastic Press, September 2015, 
 Mama Lion Wins the Race, Scholastic Press, August 2017, 
 Zen Happiness, Scholastic Press, January 2019, 
Addy's Cup of Sugar, October 20, 2020 ISBN 978-0439634281
Theater Adaptation

 Zen Shorts, Adapted for stage by Rogue Artists Ensemble, 2015
T.V. Adaptations

 Stillwater, Apple TV+, 2020-

Children's books illustrated
 Come On, Rain with author Karen Hesse, Scholastic Press, March 1999,  
 Putnam and Pennyroyal with author Patrick Jennings, Scholastic Press, November 1999, 
 Gershon's Monster: A Story for the Jewish New Year with author Eric A. Kimmel, Scholastic Press, September 2000,  
 Why I Will Never Ever Ever Ever Have Enough Time to Read This Book with author Remy Charlip, Tricycle Press, September 2000, 
 Our Gracie Aunt with author Jacqueline Woodson, Jump At The Sun, April 2002, 
 Old Turtle and the Broken Truth with author Douglas Wood, Scholastic Press, October 2003, 
 No Dogs Allowed! with author Sonia Manzano, Atheneum Books, April 2004, 
 A Family of Poems: My Favorite Poetry for Children with author Caroline Kennedy, Hyperion Books, September 2005, 
 I Will Hold You 'till You Sleep with author Linda Zuckerman, Scholastic Press, October 2006, 
 Mr. George Baker with author Amy Hest, Walker Books, June 2007, 
A Family Christmas with selection by Caroline Kennedy, Hachette Books; First edition, October 2007, 
 Stonecutter with author John Kuramoto, Feiwel & Friends, April 2009, 
 The Christmas Magic with author Lauren Thompson, Scholastic Press, September 2009, 
 City Dog, Country Frog with author Mo Willems, Hyperion Books, June 2010, 
Poems to Learn by Heart with author Caroline Kennedy, Disney-Hyperion; First edition, March 2013,

Comics/graphic novels
 Epic Illustrated #12, 19–21, 24, 31, Marvel Comics, June 1982 – August 1985
 Moonshadow #1–12 with author J. M. DeMatteis, Marvel Comics/Epic Comics, March 1985 – February 1987, collected as The Compleat Moonshadow which also includes Farewell Moonshadow, DC Comics, February 1998, 
 Dracula: A Symphony in Moonlight and Nightmares, Marvel Comics, 1986, ; NBM Publishing, January 1993 
 New Mutants #62 with author Louise Simonson, Marvel Comics, April 1988
 Havok and Wolverine: Meltdown #1–4 with authors Walt Simonson, Louise Simonson and artist Kent Williams, Marvel Comics/Epic Comics, 1988–1989, collected edition March 2003, 
 M #1–4 based on the screenplay by Fritz Lang, Eclipse Comics, 1990–1992, collected edition Abrams Books, April 2008, 
 Ray Bradbury Comics #5 comics adaptation of Bradbury's story "The April Witch", Topps Comics, October 1993
 The Mystery Play with author Grant Morrison, DC Comics, January 1994, 
 The Mythology of an Abandoned City Tundra Publishing, June 1994,  
 The Sandman: The Wake contributed the story "Exiles" with author Neil Gaiman, DC Comics, December 1996, 
 Swamp Thing: Roots DC Comics, March 1998, 978-1563893773
 Silver Surfer #139–145 (#143–144 covers only) with author J. M. DeMatteis, Marvel Comics, 1998
 9-11: Artists Respond, Volume One "Prayer" two-page story, Dark Horse Comics, January 2002 
 Global Frequency: Planet Ablaze contributed the story "Big Skys" with author Warren Ellis, DC Comics, February 2004, 
 Lucifer, Book 11: Evensong contributed the story "Nirvana" with author Mike Carey, DC Comics, January 2007, 
The Seventh Voyage: Star Diaries Author: Stanislaw Lem , Illustrator: Jon J Muth , Translator: Michael Kandel, Graphix, October 2019,

Awards

Books 
The Seventh Voyage
2020, Eisner Nomination, Best Adaptation from Another Medium
Moonshadow: The Definitive Edition
2020, Eisner Nomination, Best Archival Collection/ Project-Comic Books
2019, Broken Frontier Award, Best Collection of Classic Material
Hi, Koo!: A Year of Seasons
2016, Beehive Book Award, Winner in the Poetry Division
Zen Socks
 2015, A Junior Library Guild Selection
City Dog, Country Frog
2010, A Junior Library Guild Selection
A Christmas Magic
2010, Ohioana: The Hamilton County Committee Program; In honor of Hamilton County Authors and Composers
Stonecutter
2010, Ohioana: The Hamilton County Committee Program; In honor of Hamilton County Authors and Composers
Zen Ties
 2009, Illustrator of the Year, The Children's Choice Book Award
 2009, The Frances & Wesley Bock Book Award, Neumann University
2009, Children's Choice Book Awards, Children's Book Council
 2008, Children’s Picture Book Award, New Atlantic Independent Booksellers Association
Zen Shorts
2006, Caldecott Honor Book, The Association for Library Service to Children
2006, Book Sense Book of the Year, American Booksellers Association
2005, Children’s Picture Book Award, New Atlantic Independent Booksellers Association
The Three Questions
2002, Children's Media Honor, Achievement in Picture Books, Parent's Guide to Children's Media, Inc., Board of Directors
2002, HONORS Award, National Children's Publications Awards , National Parenting Publications Awards
Gershon's Monster: A Story for the Jewish New Year
 2000, Sydney Taylor Book Award, The Association of Jewish Libraries
 Come On, Rain
 1999, Gold Medal, The Society of Illustrators
The Mystery Play
1995, Best Painter, Will Eisner Comics Industry Award
The Mythology of an Abandoned City
 1993, Best Graphic Album nomination, Will Eisner Comics Industry Award

Other 

 Stillwater, Apple TV+ Television Series
 2021, Nomination, Annie Award
 2021, Nomination, Emmy Award
 2021, Recipient, Peabody Award

References

External links
 
 

1960 births
20th-century American artists
21st-century American artists
American children's book illustrators
American children's writers
American comics artists
American comics writers
Artists from Cincinnati
DC Comics people
Eisner Award winners for Best Painter/Multimedia Artist (Interior)
Game artists
Living people
Marvel Comics people
Marvel Comics writers